Ahmadabad (also Romanized as Aḩmadābād) is a village in Masumiyeh Rural District, in the Central District of Arak County, Markazi Province, Iran. At the 2006 census, its population was 68, in 16 families.

References 

Populated places in Arak County